Melon juice may also refer to:

Melon Juice (album), by Melon Kinenbi
"Melon Juice" (song), by HKT48